The San Jose Police Department (SJPD) is the police agency for San Jose, California.  The San Jose Police Department is led by Chief of Police Anthony Mata.

The department makes its calls for service available to the public; it is the first American city police department to make all 911 calls available via online CrimeReports.com maps. The 911 call data is updated daily.

History
The San Jose Police Department was founded in 1849. During its beginnings, the most common offenses recorded for the department were public intoxication and vagrancy, according to old jailhouse records. In 1880, the department was averaging 120 arrests per month, and the position of police chief was created. The chief also acted as the superintendent of the city jail, and by the late 1880s, the department had gone from 10 officers to 25. In the early 1905s, as the SJPD grew, more rules and regulations were instituted regarding police officers. Officers now needed to go through field training and revolver training.

The department, along with many others in the nation, changed with the introduction of the automobile and the advent of motorcycle units. The motorcycle unit mainly cited people for speeding and other traffic violations. San Jose was one of the first places to use radio and phone technology to help officers perform their duties. In 1925, the city council released the first rules and regulations manual. It was the precursor to the duty manual that the department currently uses. The San Jose Police Academy first started out as a police college for aspiring officers to earn four year bachelor's degrees with an emphasis on criminal justice. Men made up the entire police force up until 1945, when Ida Waalkes became the first female to be a sworn officer with the San Jose Police Department.

On December 8, 1941, the SJPD created an own Police Reserve Unit which exists until today, making it one of the oldest organizations of this kind in the United States. SJPD Reserve Officers are California P.O.S.T Basic Police Academy certified and therefore receive exactly the same training, including 500 hours of Field Training, as full-time police officers. 
As level I reserve officers according to § 832.6(a)(1) California Penal Code, they are sworn peace officers pursuant to § 830.6(a)(1) California Penal Code who have the same duties and responsibilities as regular officers.

Today, the unit consists of over 100 reserve officers and is on call 24 hours, seven days a week.
Community policing began to be used by the department in the early 1990s, as specific geographic areas were mapped out and assigned. This enabled  officers to get to know the people and communities they patrolled, and is partially credited for keeping San Jose one of the safest large cities in America.

In September 2007, the San Jose Police Department began making all its Calls for Service available to the public  through a partnership with Crime Reports.com. San Jose was the first American city to make all 911 calls available via online "CrimeReports.com" maps.

Since fall 2014, the San Jose Police Department maintains a uniformed auxiliary police which consists 28 of Community Service Officers (CSOs) who attend a five-week academy. The SJPD CSO is a civilian position; CSOs thus do not carry firearms and do not perform any enforcement duties. Their tasks are limited to response to lower priority calls, which shall give sworn police officers more time to respond to high risk calls.

Uniform and equipment

Uniform
The uniform of the department consists of a dark navy blue shirt for sworn officers, and a light blue or white shirt for differing civilian classifications. On the left side of the chest is worn the departmental badge, or a patch replica on certain items. The badge of a sworn police officer is a silver seven-point star reading "San Jose Police", the officer's rank, and badge number. Gold-colored badges are issued to higher ranking police officers. Civilian staff are issued eagle-top or oval shaped shields depending on classification. The San Jose Police Department patch is worn on both sleeves, with a rocker denoting classification for civilian staff. Pants are regular navy blue uniform trousers with white piping running down the side of the leg.

Weapons and equipment

The San Jose Police Departments officers normally carry tasers. The standard taser for the department is the TASER(R) X26P(TM) Smart Weapon. Officers are issued OC Spray, handcuffs, a baton, flashlight plus a handgun and two spare magazines. The standard issue semi-automatic handgun is a Glock. (Before 2013, it was from SIG Sauer).  Squad cars are normally armed with shotguns and officers are allowed to purchase patrol rifles, with individual permission of the chief and a four-day training course. The officers own these weapons and can use them for personal use as well as departmental.

In mid-2014, the department returned a mine-resistant military vehicle to the federal government.

Department Chain of Command (Office of the Chief of Police) 
Source:
 Chief Of Police Anthony Mata 
Assistant Chief Of Police Paul Joseph 
 Deputy Chief Heather Randol, Bureau of Administration
 Deputy Chief Stanley McFadden, Bureau of Field Operations
 Deputy Chief Dave Tindall, Chief Executive Officer
 Deputy Chief Ellen Washburn, Bureau of Investigations
 Deputy Director Judi Torrico, Bureau of Technical Services

Police divisions
 Foothill Division
 Western Division
 Southern Division
 Central Division

Controversy
In July 2003, Cau Bich Tran was shot and killed in her kitchen by a SJPD officer after brandishing a 10-inch vegetable peeler. The incident led to controversy among San Jose's Vietnamese community. In 2005, the city of San Jose settled the Tran family's lawsuit for $1.8 million.

The week before Halloween 2011, a 27-year-old highly intoxicated man armed with a gun (later determined to be a toy gun) was shot over 20 times by four SJPD officers and wounded after he refused to follow officers commands and grabbed the gun. He was dressed as a surgeon and had a toy gun in his waistband. In 2013, the city settled a lawsuit for $4.95 million, the largest settlement in San Jose involving police conduct.

In 2014, the department had been found to be using high tech cellphone spying systems, commonly referred to as "Stingrays." These devices act like a regular cell phone tower, causing all cell phones in the nearby vicinity to connect to it rather than the real cell site.  This gives the user of a Stingray the ability to intercept the conversations and data exchanges of all nearby cellular phone users. It was shown that the federal government gave the department a $500,000 grant for the technology. The SJPD spokesperson refused to comment on the situation.

In March 2014, Officer Geoffrey Graves was accused of raping a woman. He turned himself into Santa Clara County Jail and was arraigned on March 24.

In December 2014, SJPD officer Phillip White made statements on Twitter that he would kill people who would threaten him and his family and that he would be carrying a gun while off duty at movie theaters, in response to protests of the deaths of Michael Brown and Eric Garner. White was subsequently placed on administrative leave. The San Jose Police Association have condemned the comments. In January 2015, prosecutors declined to file charges against White.

In May 2020, in response to the George Floyd protests, the SJPD used crowd dispersal tactics including tear gas and rubber bullets under the instruction of their commander of special operations, Captain Jason Dwyer. San Jose Mayor Sam Liccardo called on the police department to explain its use of tear gas and rubber bullets after widespread criticism of law enforcement tactics during protests against police brutality. The protests started Friday May 29, 2020 and by the following Monday “the police department reports having received more than 1,200 citizen complaints related to the protests and was notified that the Office of the Independent Police Auditor had received more than 500.”  Captain Dwyer acknowledged use of force never looks good, but said officers had no choice. “If you subtract those things from the equation, then what’s left? We have archaic skirmish lines of police officers with 42-inch hardwood batons,” Dwyer said. “You tell me which one’s going to look worse: people rubbing their eyes and coughing, or officers striking individuals with batons, breaking bones and God knows how many other injuries?”. Investigations into this matter are ongoing.

During the protests in May 2020, SJPD officer Jared Yuen drew national attention on social media as videos spread of his behaviour during the George Floyd protests in California against police brutality. Yuen was videoed holding a projectile launcher, telling a protester "Shut up, bitch", then within seconds he leaned around another officer to fire a projectile at close range, which caused a fight. In other videos, Yuen is filmed saying: "Let's get this motherfucker", or seen "smirking, licking his lips and rocking back and forth, looking a little too excited to be facing off with protesters", reported San Jose Inside. The videos were viewed over 10 million times, and thousands called for Yuen's firing. SJPD chief Eddie Garcia reacted that Yuen "let his emotions get the best of him, and it's not right", but he also called Yuen a "kid" and "good cop", "who has put his life on the line for the city multiple times." As a result, Yuen was removed from protest duties.

Officer Jared Yuen is also alleged to have inappropriately shot another man in the stomach with a rubber bullet. Tim Harper, who said he was observing the protests on May 29, was shown in a viral video assisting police by carrying an injured officer away. Not long after, according to Harper, police shot a teenage boy in the head with a projectile. This prompted Harper to attempt to "walk up peacefully" to question the officers, said Harper, he was "a good distance from" police when Yuen "walked through two officers, shot me, and then stepped behind the other two officers".

Also on May 29, community activist Derrick Sanderlin suffered a ruptured testicle after police shot him with a rubber bullet, despite him being some distance away and displaying no aggressive behavior. Sanderlin said he put himself between protesters and police after he saw police shooting protesters at close range. The officers were then seen deliberately aiming at Sanderlin, and firing multiple times. Jared Yuen was one of the San Jose officers involved in this incident, although is unclear whether Yuen himself had fired at Sanderlin. Sanderlin himself had worked as a trainer of police recruits on how to reduce bias towards minorities.

Fallen officers
Since the establishment of the San Jose Police Department, 13 officers have died in the line of duty.

See also

 Fantasy flight—SJPD's Air Support Unit operated fantasy flights 2005–2007
 List of law enforcement agencies in California

References

External links
 San Jose Police Organizational Chart
 San Jose Police Department
 San José Police Department Reserve Unit
 San Jose Police Department recruiting
 San Jose Police Foundation

Government of San Jose, California
Law enforcement in the San Francisco Bay Area
Municipal police departments of California